Luis Antonio Amarilla Lencina (born 25 August 1995) is a Paraguayan footballer who plays as a striker for Minnesota United.

International career
He made his debut for the Paraguay national football team on 2 September 2021 in a World Cup qualifier against Ecuador, a 0–2 away loss. He started the game and played the full match.

Honours 
Libertad
Paraguayan Primera División (1): 2014 Clausura

LDU Quito
Supercopa Ecuador (1): 2021

References

External links 
Profile at Vélez Sarsfield's official website 

1995 births
Living people
Paraguayan footballers
Paraguayan expatriate footballers
Paraguay under-20 international footballers
Paraguay international footballers
Paraguayan Primera División players
Argentine Primera División players
Ecuadorian Serie A players
Club Libertad footballers
Club Atlético 3 de Febrero players
Club Sol de América footballers
Club Atlético Vélez Sarsfield footballers
C.D. Universidad Católica del Ecuador footballers
Minnesota United FC players
L.D.U. Quito footballers
Paraguayan expatriate sportspeople in Argentina
Paraguayan expatriate sportspeople in Ecuador
Expatriate footballers in Argentina
Expatriate footballers in Ecuador
People from Areguá
Association football forwards
Designated Players (MLS)
Major League Soccer players